A special election was held in  to fill a vacancy left by the resignation of Abner Lacock (DR) before the 13th Congress assembled.

Electoral results

See also
List of special elections to the United States House of Representatives

References

Pennsylvania 15
1813 15
Pennsylvania 1813 15
Pennsylvania 15
1813 Pennsylvania elections
United States House of Representatives 1813 15